The 2022 Copa Constitució was the 30th edition of the Andorran national football knockout tournament. The opening round of this edition of the cup was played on 16 January 2022.

Sant Julià were the defending champions after winning the previous final over Atlètic Club d'Escaldes by a score of 2–1.

Schedule

First round
Twelve clubs competed in the first round. The matches were played on played on 16 January 2022.

|}

Quarter–finals
Eight clubs competed in the quarter–finals: the six winners from the first round and two clubs receiving a bye.

|}

Semi–finals
The four quarter–final winners competed in the semi–finals.

|}

Final
The final was played between the winners of the semi-finals on 29 May 2022.

See also
2021–22 Primera Divisió
2021–22 Segona Divisió

References

External links
UEFA

Andorra
Cup
2022